Andrei Kravtsov (born 10 May 1971) is an Australian former gymnast who won four gold medals at the 1998 Commonwealth Games in Kuala Lumpur.

Biography
Kravtsov is originally from the Russian city of Kursk and got started in gymnastics aged seven. After a two-year hiatus from gymnastics, he began competing again when he migrated to Australia in 1993. Based on Gold Coast initially, he was accepted into the AIS in 1995 and took up Australian citizenship.

Representing his adopted country, he was 27th in the men's all-around event at the 1995 World Artistic Gymnastics Championships. This qualified him for the 1996 Summer Olympics, but only six weeks out from the competition he snapped his right Achilles tendon, which forced him to withdraw.

He was 19th in men's all-around at the 1997 World Artistic Gymnastics Championships.

His finest moment came at the 1998 Commonwealth Games, where he took home four individual gold medals, in the all-around, floor exercise, parallel bars, pommel horse. He was also fourth in the horizontal bars and won a silver medal as part of the men's all-around team.

Injury also cost him a place in the 2000 Summer Olympics squad. He retired from the sport in 2002.

Kravtsov now runs his own gymnastics centre in Batemans Bay.

In 2012 he was inducted into the Gymnastics Australia Hall of Fame.

References

External links
Andrei Kravtsov results at the Commonwealth Games

1971 births
Living people
Australian male artistic gymnasts
Commonwealth Games gold medallists for Australia
Commonwealth Games silver medallists for Australia
Commonwealth Games medallists in gymnastics
Gymnasts at the 1998 Commonwealth Games
Russian emigrants to Australia
Sportspeople from Kursk
Medallists at the 1998 Commonwealth Games